Gressli is a village in the municipality of Tydal in Trøndelag county, Norway.

History
In 1878, 2,253 coins were found on the Gressli farm during potato hilling on a spot where there had once been a heap of rocks.  The Gressli discovery is our most important source of knowledge about Olav Kyrre's extensive minting in Norway from 1067 until 1093. In 1881, a meticulous record of the find was published by L. B. Stenersen, the director of the Coin Cabinet. It has since been studied by a series of scholars.

References

Villages in Trøndelag
Tydal